Dhāraṇā is translated as "collection or concentration of the mind (joined with the retention of breath)", or "the act of holding, bearing, wearing, supporting, maintaining, retaining, keeping back (in remembrance), a good memory", or "firmness, steadfastness, certainty". This term is related to the verbal Sanskrit roots dha and ana,  to hold, carry, maintain, resolve. Dharana is the noun.

Dhāraṇā is the sixth limb of eight elucidated by Patanjali's Ashtanga Yoga or Raja Yoga in his Yoga Sutras of Patanjali.

Overview
Dhāraṇā may be translated as "holding", "holding steady", "concentration", or "single focus". The prior limb Pratyahara involves withdrawing the senses from external phenomena. Dhāraṇā builds further upon this by refining it further to ekagrata or ekagra chitta, that is single-pointed concentration and focus, which is in this context cognate with Samatha. Gregor Maehle (2006: p. 234) defines Dharana as: "The mind thinks about one object and avoids other thoughts; awareness of the object is still interrupted."

Dhāraṇā is the initial step of deep concentration meditation, where the object being focused upon is held in the mind without consciousness wavering from it. The difference between Dhāraṇā, Dhyāna, and Samādhi (their "integration" constituting Samyama) is that in the former, the object of meditation, the mystic, and the act of meditation itself remain separate. That is, the mystic or the mystic's meta-awareness is conscious of meditating (that is, is conscious of the act of meditation) on an object, and of one's own self, which is concentrating on the object. As the seer becomes more advanced, dwelling in the subsequent stage of Dhyāna, consciousness of the act of meditation disappears, and only the consciousness of being/existing and the object of concentration register (in the mind). In the final stage of Samādhi, the ego-mind also dissolves, and the seer becomes one with the object. Generally, the object of concentration is God, or the Self, which is seen as an expression of God.

See also
 Ekagrata
 Beginner's mind
 Ganana
 Tratak

Notes

References

External links
 Dharana Comments on the Patanjali's Scheme.
 Dharana, by Yogacharya

Eight limbs of yoga